"How to Save a Life" is a song by American alternative rock band The Fray, released in March 2006 as the second single from their debut studio album of the same name. The song is one of the band's most popular airplay songs and peaked in the top 3 of the Billboard Hot 100 chart in the United States. It became the joint seventh longest charting single on the Billboard Hot 100, tying with Santana's "Smooth" (1999), at 58 consecutive weeks. The song has been certified 3× Platinum by the RIAA, and has sold 4.7 million downloads as of January 2015, the fourth best-selling rock song in digital history.

"How to Save a Life" is the band's biggest hit single to date, topping the Adult Top 40 chart for 15 consecutive weeks and topping the Canadian Airplay Chart. It was also nominated for a Grammy Award for Best Rock Performance by a Duo or Group with Vocal in 2007, but lost to "Dani California" by Red Hot Chili Peppers.

Background and writing
According to lead singer Isaac Slade, the song was composed and influenced by his experience while working as a mentor at a camp for troubled teenagers:

Slade claims that the song is about all of the people that tried to reach out to the boy but were unsuccessful. As Slade says in an interview, the boy's friends and family approached him by saying, "Quit taking drugs and cutting yourself or I won't talk to you again," but all he needed was some support. The boy was losing friends and going through depression. He lost his best friend and could not deal with it. The verses of the song describe an attempt by an adult to confront a troubled teen. In the chorus, the singer laments that he himself was unable to save a friend because he did not know how.

While this was the original intent of the song, the band has opened the song to interpretation. They created a website where fans were welcome to submit music videos they had made for the song. This arose from the response that Slade got from the song:

During an interview in Sauce, Bob Wilson asked Slade, "'How to Save a Life' was apparently inspired by an experience you had as a mentor to a boy who had a drug problem. What's the story behind that?" Slade answered:

Commercial success
The song is the band's first to achieve significant popularity outside of the United States. "How to Save a Life" was a top five hit in Australia, Canada, Ireland, Italy, Spain, Sweden and the United Kingdom. 
Due to an early leak by BBC Radio 1 in the United Kingdom, where it was the band's debut single, the song was released in the territory five weeks earlier than planned. It debuted at number 29 on the UK Singles Chart on January 21, 2007, via downloads alone. Instead of its planned release date which was to be March 26, 2007, the single was physically released in the United Kingdom on February 28 and gradually rose up the chart, reaching number five on February 25, staying there for four weeks. It eventually peaked at number four on the UK Singles Chart on April 8 and became Britain's eleventh biggest-selling song of 2007. On March 29, "How to Save a Life" peaked at number 1 in Ireland, becoming their first and only number one single in the country to date. The song only stayed at the top spot for a week but sales still proved strong after it fell from number 1.

The song was ranked No. 24 on Billboards Best Adult Pop Songs of the Decade, and No. 47 on Billboard's Top 100 Digital Tracks of the Decade. It was also ranked No. 58 on Billboard's Hot 100 Songs of the Decade and No. 56 on Rhapsody's list of the Top 100 Tracks of the Decade. The song was the 25th most downloaded song of all time on iTunes as of February 2010. The song has sold over 4.7 million copies in the US as of January 2015.

 In popular culture 

The song was first featured on ABC's Grey's Anatomy, after Alexandra Patsavas, the music supervisor for the show, saw the band perform in Los Angeles. Alexandra then incorporated the song into the second-season episode "Superstition". After its usage in the episode, the song became a minor Hot 100 hit. The song became an "unofficial theme" for the other members of the Grey's Anatomy production after the episode aired, leading to the decision that the song would be used in the main promotion for the third season in the show. Grey's Anatomy is credited with bringing popularity to the song. It was also used in the show's musical episode when Callie was having surgery to save her and baby Sofia's life. It was also used when Derek died and Meredith stood at his bedside.  The song also featured prominently in the season five Scrubs episode "My Lunch", and was used as the song of choice for the 'best bits' of season 8 of Big Brother UK.

"How to Save a Life" was also featured in One Tree Hill.

Music videos

The original music video, which premiered on VH1 on September 12, 2006, featured the recurring themes of light and stopped time. This music video shows the scene of a car crash and all of its presumed victims in pause. There is a recurring light throughout the video shining brightly in the dark woods that the video takes place in. Scenes of the band playing in a dark warehouse are intercut with the story going on outside. This version of the video was placed at No. 21 of the year by VH1's "Top 40 Videos of 2006".

Another version of the music video juxtaposes scenes from Grey's Anatomy to scenes of the original music video. However, all the scenes of the presumed car crash victims are excluded and only scenes of the Fray playing in a warehouse are shown.

A third music video, directed by Mark Pellington, was released for the song on December 6, 2006. The video features various adolescents, most of which seem to be between 12 and 18 in age, all who appear to be depressed and suicidal, or possibly mourning the loss of a loved one. All of these children have lost a significant loved one prior to the video, and many of them cry and scream in the video, all against a white background. Scenes of the band playing the song against this same white background are also shown throughout the video. Many numbered steps are shown alongside them, such as "Remember", "Cry", or "Let It Go". The video ends with each child finding a catharsis and making peace with themselves or others. This version of the video debuted on MTV's Total Request Live (TRL) at No. 9, and went on to top the countdown at No. 1 on December 21, 2006, becoming the band's first TRL No. 1, and also becoming the last No. 1 video on TRL for 2006.

Track listings
CD 1 
 "How to Save a Life" (single mix) - 4:00
 "She Is" – Acoustic from Stripped Raw + Real

CD 2 
 "How to Save a Life" (album version) - 4:22
 "How to Save a Life" – Acoustic from Stripped Raw + Real - 4:22
 "She Is" – Acoustic from Stripped Raw + Real
 "How to Save a Life" – CD-R

 Personnel The Fray Isaac Slade – lead vocals, acoustic piano
 Dave Welsh – lead guitars 
 Joe King – rhythm guitars, backing vocals
 Dan Battenhouse – bass
 Ben Wysocki – drumsProduction'
Produced by Aaron Johnson and Mike Flynn

Charts

Weekly charts

Year-end charts

Decade-end charts

All-time charts

Certifications

References

2000s ballads
2005 songs
2006 singles
Epic Records singles
The Fray songs
Irish Singles Chart number-one singles
Music videos directed by Mark Pellington
Rock ballads
Songs about suicide
Songs written by Isaac Slade
Songs written by Joe King (guitarist)